Jørgen Haagen Schmith (18 December 1910 – 15 October 1944), better known under the codename ), was a renowned fighter in the Danish resistance movement during the German Occupation of Denmark of 1940-45. In 1951 he and his partner Bent Faurschou Hviid were posthumously awarded the United States Medal of Freedom by President Harry Truman.

In the 21st century, two films have been released about the Danish Resistance: With the Right to Kill (2003), a documentary; and Flame and Citron (2008), about the renowned partners and the Holger Danske group.

World War II
Just before the war, Schmith found work as a concierge and stage manager at Zigeunerhallen music hall in Copenhagen.

Following the German invasion, Schmith joined the Danish Resistance movement. He became a member of the Holger Danske group, based in Copenhagen. He performed spectacular operations together with fellow resistance fighter Bent Faurschou Hviid (Flame), in which Citron generally served as driver and Flame as executioner of their targets.

In July 1943, Schmith sabotaged a Citroën garage. Six German cars and a tank were destroyed. From that action, he was given the code name of "Citron."

On 19 September 1944, Faurschou Hviid and Schmith disguised themselves as policemen. On that day, the Germans happened to arrest the entire Danish police force, capturing the two men. Although they were exhaustively sought by the Gestapo, they were not immediately recognized. Schmith jumped a fence to escape, and was shot in the process. He was rescued by an ambulance and recovered. Faurschou-Hviid slipped away during the confusion.

Schmith moved to a safe house at Jægersborg Allé 184. Faurschou-Hviid relocated to Jutland following their escape, but he left all of his weapons under Schmith's bed. A month after their escape, German soldiers arrived at the house to arrest or kill Schmith. He fought for hours against an overwhelming force of enemy troops, killing 11 and wounding scores of others. The Germans finally set the house on fire, shooting and killing Schmith as he tried to escape from the flames.

Legacy and honors
Schmith has a memorial stone in Ryvangen Memorial Park with the inscription:

FOR ALLE GODE TANKERDE KAN SLET IKKE DØFØR ENDNU BEDRE TANKERER SPIRED AF DERES FRØ

This roughly translates to:

FOR ALL GOOD THOUGHTSTHEY CANNOT DIEBEFORE EVEN BETTER THOUGHTSARE SPROUTED FROM THEIR SEEDS

In 1951 he and Flame (Faurschou Hvild) were posthumously awarded the United States Medal of Freedom by President Harry Truman.

Representation in other media
After decades of official silence about the Resistance movement, Peter Øvig Knudsen published a novel about the Resistance, With the Right to Kill, and its execution of an estimated 400 persons.
In 2003, this was adapted as the documentary film With the Right to Kill, exploring the actions of the Danish Resistance, including the Holger Danske group. Directed and co-written by Morten Henriksen, it used historic footage, interviews and reconstructions of events.
In 2008 Danish producer Lars Bredo Rahbek released a drama/action film about Schmith and Faurschou Hviid, entitled Flame & Citron (Flammen og Citronen). It was directed by Ole Madsen, with Mads Mikkelsen playing the role of Citron and Thure Lindhardt as Flame.

References

External links 
 
 
 
 
 

Danish resistance members
Resistance members killed by Nazi Germany
Deaths by firearm in Denmark
Recipients of the Medal of Freedom
1910 births
1944 deaths